Viola is an unincorporated community in Shasta County, California, United States.

References

Unincorporated communities in California
Unincorporated communities in Shasta County, California